David Scott-Morgan (born David Raymond Morgan, 19 August 1942) is an English songwriter and musician.

Career
Morgan was a member of The Uglys with Steve Gibbons between 1967 and 1969, where he was the bassist and vocalist. Morgan was part of the spin-off Balls with Gibbons and Trevor Burton, until he was replaced by Denny Laine.

Morgan was subsequently bassist and vocalist with Magnum, departing before their debut album, and was guitarist with E.L.O. from 1981 to 1986. He is credited with performing background vocals on the 1983 E.L.O. album Secret Messages.

Morgan formed the Tandy-Morgan Band with E.L.O keyboardist Richard Tandy in 1985. Together they recorded the concept album Earthrise. The album contained 14 tracks, all written by Morgan, with Tandy's keyboard arrangements. Earthrise was produced with Steve Lipson, and eventually released on vinyl in 1986 on the FM Revolver label. In 1992, Morgan released the album on CD. In 2011 a revised and updated version, titled EARTHRISE Special Edition, was released on the Rock Legacy label.

When interviewed by the editorial board of the E.L.O. fan club, Tandy and Morgan were asked if they had "any music that's never been released". They revealed that they did and in 1987 released B.C. Collection, songs recorded by Morgan, Tandy and bass player Martin Smith between 1985 and 1987. The album contained the original version of the song "Hiroshima", which was a hit in Germany in 1978 for the band Wishful Thinking. In 1990, the German singer Sandra's version was a No. 4 hit, again in Germany.

Other songs written by Morgan were "Something", written for The Move, and released as a B-side to their 1968 No. 1 hit "Blackberry Way"; and "This Time Tomorrow", also written for The Move, and released as a B-side to their 1969 hit "Curly".

Morgan also recorded an album in 1970 that was issued on the now defunct US Ampex label as Morgan and later in Germany on the Global label.  It was not released in the UK and has not been reissued. After 1987, Morgan continued releasing solo albums, on his privately owned label, some of which are inspired by his Christian faith.

Personal life
Morgan married Mandy Scott in April 1997, and is now known as David Scott-Morgan. He is also a qualified pilot and part-time flight instructor at Wellesbourne Mountford Aerodrome near Stratford-upon-Avon.

Discography

Solo albums
 Morgan (1971) – US only release initially
 Call (1997)  – Dave Morgan Music
 Long Way Home  (1999) – Scottmorgan Music
 Reel 2 (2001)  – Scottmorgan Music
 Across the Divide (2012)  – Grimm Doo Records
 Bubbles (2017) –  (as Morganisation) – promotional copy only
Highland E.P. (2018) –  (as Morganisation) – Grimm Doo Records
Seven (2019) (as Morganisation) – Grimm Doo Records
Bubbles 2 (2019) –  (as Morganisation) – Grimm Doo Records

References

External links
 Dave Morgan
 Dave Morgan | AllMusic
 Discography
 Dave Morgan's Website
 Dave Morgan's band Website
 David Morgan on YouTube.
 Dave Scott-Morgan Resume website

1942 births
Living people
Musicians from Birmingham, West Midlands
Electric Light Orchestra members
English rock bass guitarists
Male bass guitarists
English songwriters
Magnum (band) members